Marcel Willard (25 July 1889 – 17 February 1956) was a French lawyer and politician. He served in the French Army during World War I, and was awarded the Croix de Guerre for it. He earned a bachelor of laws and began his career as a lawyer. He then served in the French Resistance during World War II, and was awarded the Croix de Guerre a second time, and Resistance Medal, and made an officer of the Legion of honour after the war. He served as a Communist member of the French Senate from 1946 to 1948.

References

1889 births
1956 deaths
Lawyers from Paris
French military personnel of World War I
Communist members of the French Resistance
Recipients of the Croix de Guerre 1914–1918 (France)
Recipients of the Croix de Guerre 1939–1945 (France)
Officiers of the Légion d'honneur
20th-century French lawyers
French Communist Party members
French Senators of the Fourth Republic
French senators elected by the National Assembly
Politicians from Paris